Centroscyllium is a genus of big-eyed, deepwater dogfishes with no anal fin, a grey or black-brown body, and dorsal spines, with the second one being much larger than the first. Seven extant species are described.

Species
 Centroscyllium excelsum Shirai & Nakaya, 1990 (highfin dogfish)
 Centroscyllium fabricii J. C. H. Reinhardt, 1825 (black dogfish)
 Centroscyllium granulatum Günther, 1887 (granular dogfish)
 Centroscyllium kamoharai T. Abe, 1966 (bareskin dogfish)
 Centroscyllium nigrum Garman, 1899 (combtooth dogfish)
 Centroscyllium ornatum Alcock, 1889 (ornate dogfish)
 Centroscyllium ritteri Jordan & Fowler, 1903 (whitefin dogfish)

References

 
Shark genera
Taxa named by Johannes Peter Müller
Taxa named by Friedrich Gustav Jakob Henle